D. nepalensis may refer to:

 Debaryomyces nepalensis, a yeast that reproduces by budding
 Deliaesianum nepalensis, a ground beetle
 Deltocolpodes nepalensis, a ground beetle
 Deltomerodes nepalensis, a ground beetle
 Desera nepalensis, a ground beetle
 Diplotaxis nepalensis, a plant native to Europe
 Dipolaelaps nepalensis, a mite with a single pair of spiracles positioned laterally on the body
 Dorcus nepalensis, a stag beetle
 Dromius nepalensis, a ground beetle
 Drosophila nepalensis, a fruit fly
 Dysphania nepalensis, a Central Asian plant